Floris (also J. Floris Ltd or Floris of London Holdings Ltd) is the oldest English retailer of fragrance and toiletries and is still family owned and run today by the 8th and 9th generations of the family.

History 
Juan Famenias Floris arrived in England from his native island of Menorca to seek his fortune. Shortly after his arrival in 1730, he secured premises in Jermyn Street, in the elegant quarter of London's St. James's. Floris initially set up business as a barber shop and comb-maker; however missing the aromas and sensations of his Mediterranean youth, he and his wife Elizabeth began making and selling perfume.

Royal warrant 
The first Royal Warrant granted to J. Floris Ltd was in 1820 as 'Smooth Pointed Comb-makers' to the then King George IV soon after his accession. Today this first Royal warrant is still on display at 89 Jermyn Street together with no less than 19 others. Floris holds the warrants Perfumers to HM The Queen Elizabeth II, granted in 1971, and Manufacturers of Toilet Preparations to HRH The Prince of Wales, granted in 1984.

Stores 
The London store is in Jermyn Street, London, in the same building Juan Floris created the business in the 18th century. The mahogany counter used in the store was purchased from the Great Exhibition at the Crystal Palace in Hyde Park in 1851.

In 2012, Floris opened a second London shop at 147 Ebury Street, Belgravia, offering the full Floris range, together with a Bespoke Perfumery service.

Notable customers 
The Floris archives hold letters from famous customers detailing their preferences and their thanks, including the following examples:

 Florence Nightingale wrote a 25 July 1863 letter thanking Mr Floris for his 'sweet-smelling nosegay'. 
 Mary Shelley, whilst abroad, sent friends instructions to purchase her favourite combs and toothbrushes from Floris. 
 Beau Brummell in the early 19th century would discuss his current fragrances at length with Mr Floris. 
 Floris also creates bespoke fragrances for the British royal family, including the creation of a unisex fragrance for the wedding of the Duke and Duchess of Sussex in 2018.

Floris is also referenced by fictional characters. Al Pacino's character in Scent of a Woman famously declared he knew the 'woman in his sights' was wearing a Floris fragrance. In the James Bond novel Moonraker, Ian Fleming writes that Floris supplies the soaps and other toiletries in the restrooms in the private club Blades. James Bond himself always wore Floris No.89,

References

External links
Floris Website and Online Shop
Floris on Fragrantica.com
Floris on Basenotes.net

British Royal Warrant holders
Luxury brands
Shops in London
Retail companies established in 1730
Buildings and structures in the City of Westminster
English brands
Retail companies of England
Perfume houses
Companies based in the City of Westminster
1730 establishments in England
British companies established in 1730